The premier of Prince Edward Island is the first minister for the Canadian province of Prince Edward Island. They are the province's head of government and de facto chief executive.

Prince Edward Island was a British crown colony before it joined Canadian Confederation in 1873. It has had a system of responsible government since 1851, and the province kept its own legislature to deal with provincial matters after joining Confederation. Prince Edward Island has a unicameral Westminster-style parliamentary government, in which the premier is the leader of the party that controls the most seats in the Legislative Assembly.  The premier is Prince Edward Island's head of government, and the king of Canada is its head of state and is represented by the lieutenant governor of Prince Edward Island. The premier picks a cabinet from the elected members to form the Executive Council of Prince Edward Island, and presides over that body.

Members are first elected to the legislature during general elections. General elections must be conducted every five years from the date of the last election, but the premier may ask for early dissolution of the Legislative Assembly. An election may also take place if the governing party loses the confidence of the legislature by the defeat of a supply bill or tabling of a confidence motion.

Prince Edward Island has had 45 government leaders since it became a colony in 1851. The province had 7 premiers while a colony and 33 premiers after joining Confederation, of which 16 were from the Prince Edward Island Progressive Conservative Party and 23 were from the Prince Edward Island Liberal Party. The current premier is Dennis King, since May 9, 2019. King was the first premier of a minority government in PEI since 1890. King's party gained seats in two by-elections in 2020 and 2021, giving him a majority government.

List of premiers of Prince Edward Island

See also
 Leader of the Opposition (Prince Edward Island)

References
General

 
 

Specific

External links
 Prince Edward Island: Premier's Office

Prince Edward Island

Premiers
Premiers